Roberto Javier Mina Mercado (born November 7, 1984) is an Ecuadorian soccer striker who plays for Emelec in the Serie A de Ecuador.

Club career
Prior joining Belgrano, Mina played for FC Dallas in MLS, Emelec, Deportivo Quevedo, LDU (Loja), and El Nacional in his native Ecuador, as well as for Huracán in Argentina. Mina scored seven league goals for Dallas in his first year in MLS. Mina missed a good portion of the 2006 season with an injury to his knee; as a result, he finished with only 16 appearances (of which nine were starts) and three goals. The following season, Mina's injuries woes continued and he was ruled out for the entire season after straining his knee in a pre-season friendly.  Due to these injuries Mina's contract was not extended. In Spring of 2008 he returned to Argentina to join first division club Gimnasia jujuy according to local media, however the suspected move never became reality. At the end of the summer and after a few months without a club Mina joined second division Argentine club Belgrano de Cordoba as a promising attacking option for Belgrano in the current Nacional B promotion Championship.

In December 2010 he was signed once again by Ecuadorian giants Emelec in a 2-year contract.

International career
Mina has appeared for Ecuador national football team on various youth levels, and got his first senior cap during the 2002–03 season. He has appeared in 12 matches for the senior team.

References

1984 births
Living people
Ecuadorian footballers
Ecuadorian expatriate footballers
Ecuadorian expatriate sportspeople in the United States
Club Atlético Huracán footballers
C.D. Olmedo footballers
C.S. Emelec footballers
C.D. El Nacional footballers
C.S.D. Macará footballers
Club Atlético Belgrano footballers
Expatriate footballers in Argentina
FC Dallas players
Ecuador international footballers
Sportspeople from Guayaquil
Major League Soccer players
Association football forwards